The 2009 United States motorcycle Grand Prix was the eighth round of the 2009 Grand Prix motorcycle racing season. It took place on the weekend of July 3–5, 2009 at Laguna Seca. As usual, only the MotoGP class was permitted to race at Laguna Seca due to the Californian air pollution law prohibiting two-stroke engines in the state. Spain's Dani Pedrosa took his first win for a year, holding off a last-lap surge from championship leader Valentino Rossi.

MotoGP classification

Championship standings after the race (MotoGP)
Below are the standings for the top five riders and constructors after round eight has concluded.

Riders' Championship standings

Constructors' Championship standings

 Note: Only the top five positions are included for both sets of standings.

References

United States motorcycle Grand Prix
United States
United States Motorcycle Grand Prix
United States Motorcycle Grand Prix